Jeanne Kalogridis (pronounced Jean Kal-o-GREED-us), also known by the pseudonym J.M. Dillard (born 1954), is an American writer of historical, science and horror fiction.

She was born in Florida and studied at the University of South Florida, earning first a BA in Russian and then an MA in Linguistics. After college she taught English as a foreign language at the American University in Washington, D.C., before moving to the West Coast.

Bibliography of works

The Diaries of the Family Dracul
Covenant with the Vampire (1995)
Children of the Vampire (1996)
Lord of the Vampires (1997)

Novels
Specters (1991) (as J.M. Dillard)
The Burning Times (1997)
The Borgia Bride (2005)
I, Mona Lisa (2006) (UK title: Painting Mona Lisa)
The Devil's Queen (2009)
The Scarlet Contessa: A Novel of the Italian Renaissance (2010)
The Inquisitor's Wife (2013)
The Orphan of Florence (2017)

Movie Novelizations
The Fugitive (1993)
Bulletproof Monk (2003)

Star Trek: The Original Series
Mindshadow (1985)
Demons (1986)
Bloodthirst (1987)
The Lost Years (1989)
Recovery (1995)

Star Trek Movie Novelizations
Star Trek V: The Final Frontier (1989)
Star Trek VI: The Undiscovered Country (1991)
Star Trek Generations (1994)
Star Trek: First Contact (1996)
Star Trek: Insurrection (1998)
Star Trek: Nemesis (2002)

Star Trek: The Next Generation
Possession (1996) (with Kathleen O'Malley)
Resistance (2007)

Star Trek: Deep Space Nine
Emissary (1993)

Star Trek: Enterprise
Surak's Soul (2003)
The Expanse (2003)

War of the Worlds
The Resurrection (1988)

Other books
Star Trek: Where No One Has Gone Before - A History in Pictures (1994)
Star Trek: The Next Generation Sketchbook - The Movie: Generations & First Contact (1998) (with John Eaves)

References

External links
J M Dillard - Fantasticfiction 
Jeanne Kalogridis - Fantasticfiction
J.M. Dillard Titles - Simon
Jeanne Kalogridis - Randomhouse
Jeanne M. Dillard at the Library of Congress online catalog
Jeanne Kalogridis at the Library of Congress online catalog

1954 births
Living people
20th-century American novelists
21st-century American novelists
20th-century American women writers
21st-century American women writers
American historical novelists
American horror writers
University of South Florida alumni
Women horror writers
American women novelists
Women historical novelists
21st-century American male writers